This article contains lists of official third party and independent candidates associated with the 2012 United States presidential election.

"Third party" is a term commonly used in the United States to refer to political parties other than the two major parties, the Democratic Party and Republican Party.  An independent candidate is one who runs for office with no formal party affiliation.

Those listed as candidates have done one or more of the following: formally announced they are candidates in the 2012 presidential election, filed as candidates with the Federal Election Commission (FEC), and/or received the presidential nomination of their respective party.  They are listed alphabetically by surname within each section.

Ballot access to 270 or more electoral votes
vote totals on ballots representing 270 electoral votes. All other candidates were on the ballots of fewer than 10 states, 100 electors, and less than 20% of voters nationwide.

No candidates were "spoilers", i.e. having a greater total in any state greater than the margin between the top two candidates.

Libertarian Party

Nominee

Ballot access

Candidates

Declined to run

The following people were the focus of presidential speculation in past media reports, but ultimately decided to not run for the nomination of the Libertarian Party. 

 Ron Paul, U.S. Representative of Texas, candidate for the Republican 2012 presidential nomination, and 1988 Libertarian Presidential nominee.
 Wayne Allyn Root of Nevada, entrepreneur and 2008 Libertarian vice-presidential nominee.

Green Party

Nominee

Ballot access

Candidates

Declined to run
The following people were the focus of presidential speculation in past media reports, but ultimately decided to not run for the nomination of the Green Party. 

Jello Biafra, musician and Green Party activist of California
Van Jones, former White House Green Jobs Czar

Americans Elect

 No nominee

Americans Elect announced on May 17, 2012, that it would not field a candidate for president, as no candidate garnered enough support in the organization's online primary to reach its self-imposed threshold for the nomination.

Ballot access

Candidates
The following were the only four declared candidates to achieve more than 1,000 supporters for the presidential nomination of Americans Elect prior to the organization's announcement that it would not field a 2012 presidential candidate:

Declined to run
The following people were the focus of presidential speculation in past media reports, but ultimately decided to not run for the nomination of Americans Elect.
 Howard Schultz, CEO of Starbucks

Constitution Party

Nominee

Ballot access

Candidates

Declined to run
The following people were the focus of presidential speculation in past media reports, but ultimately decided to not run for the nomination of the Constitution Party.
 Roy Moore, former Chief Justice of the Alabama Supreme Court

Justice Party

Nominee

Ballot access

Ballot access to fewer than 270, but more than 50 electoral votes

Party for Socialism and Liberation

Nominee

Ballot access

American Independent Party

Nominee

Ballot access

Candidates

Peace and Freedom Party

Nominee

Ballot access

Candidates

Socialist Workers Party

Nominee

Ballot access

Socialist Party USA

Nominee

Ballot access

Ballot access to fewer than 50 electoral votes

America's Party

Nominee

Ballot access

Objectivist Party

Nominee

Ballot access

American Third Position Party

Nominee

Ballot access

Reform Party USA

Nominee

Ballot access

Candidates

Socialist Equality Party

Nominee

Ballot access

Grassroots Party

Nominee

Ballot access

Prohibition Party

Nominee

Ballot access

Candidate

No ballot access

Boston Tea Party

No nominee – the Boston Tea Party dissolved itself on July 22, 2012, citing decline in membership activity.

Former Nominee

Freedom Socialist Party

Nominee

Ballot access

Modern Whig Party

Nominee

Ballot access

Independent

Ballot access

 Alabama, Iowa, Oregon, New Hampshire, New Jersey, Rhode Island, Vermont, and Wyoming are not listed below unless the candidate has been directly placed on the ballot.

 The following are the additional candidates who qualified for ballot status in at least one state (bolded) or as a formally recognized write-in candidate (italics):
Richard Duncan (Independent) – Alaska, Delaware, Florida, Idaho, Illinois, Indiana, Kansas, Kentucky, Maryland, Montana, Ohio, West Virginia
Samm Tittle (We The People) – Arizona, California, Colorado, Idaho, Indiana, Kansas, Louisiana, Montana, Utah, West Virginia
Jill Reed (Twelve Visions) – Arizona, Colorado, Delaware, Florida, Georgia, Illinois, Indiana, Maine, Maryland, Ohio, Utah
Will Christensen (American Independent Party) – Arizona, Delaware, Idaho, Kansas, Maryland, Montana, Oregon, Utah
Randall Terry (Independent) – Colorado, Indiana, Kentucky, Nebraska, Ohio, West Virginia
Dean Morstad (Constitutional Govt.) – Alaska, Delaware, Idaho, Maryland, Minnesota, Montana, Utah, West Virginia
Jeff Boss (NSA Did 9/11) – New Jersey
Barbara Dale Washer (Mississippi Reform) – Mississippi
Jerry Litzel (Independent) – Iowa

Declined to run
The following people were the focus of presidential speculation in past media reports, but ultimately decided not to run as independent candidates. 
Michael Bloomberg, Mayor of New York City (2002–2013), CEO of Bloomberg L.P. (Draft movement)
Lou Dobbs, broadcast journalist and commentator from New Jersey
Ralph Nader, attorney, Consumer advocate, and perennial presidential candidate of Connecticut
Ron Paul, U.S. Representative from TX-13 (1997–2013) and TX-22 (1976–1977; 1979–1985)
Bernie Sanders, U.S. Senator from Vermont (2007–present).
Donald Trump, businessman and television personality from New York
Jesse Ventura, former Governor of Minnesota

See also
2012 Democratic Party presidential candidates
2012 Republican Party presidential candidates
2012 United States presidential election timeline

References

External links
Independent Political Report
2012 Presidential Form 2 Filers at the Federal Election Commission (FEC)

 
2012 presidential candidates